The International Conference on Communications (ICC) is an annual international academic conference organised by the Institute of Electrical and Electronics Engineers' Communications Society. The conference grew out of the Global Communications Conference (GLOBECOM) when, in 1965, the seventh GLOBECOM was sponsored by the Communications Society's predecessor as the "IEEE Communications Convention". The following year it adopted its current name and GLOBECOM was disbanded (it has since been revived). The conference was held in the United States until 1984 when it was held in Amsterdam; it has since been held in several other countries.

Some major telecommunications discoveries have been announced at ICC, such as the invention of turbo codes. In fact, this ground breaking paper had been submitted to ICC the previous year, but was rejected by the referees who thought the results too good to be true.

Recent ICCs have been attended by 2500–3000 people.

Conferences

References 

IEEE conferences
Telecommunication conferences
Computer networking conferences